Bryan Payton (born August 2, 1986 in West Covina, California) is a professional Canadian football linebacker most recently for the Toronto Argonauts of the Canadian Football League. He signed as a free agent with the Argonauts on May 16, 2012. Payton was a member of the 100th Grey Cup winning team. 

Born in Camp Pendleton, Payton attended West Covina High School in West Covina, California. He also played college football at Oregon State.

References

External links
Toronto Argonauts profile page

1986 births
Living people
American players of Canadian football
Toronto Argonauts players
Canadian football linebackers
sportspeople from West Covina, California